Hoevelaken is a railway station in the municipality of Amersfoort (province of Utrecht) near Hoevelaken, the Netherlands. The station lies on the Oosterspoorweg, but is only served by Connexxion trains from the Valleilijn and opened on 9 December 2012. Previously, Hoevelaken had a station on the Utrecht - Zwolle railway line from 1905 to 1938.

Train services
, the following local train services call at this station:

Stoptrein: Amersfoort - Barneveld - Ede-Wageningen
Stoptrein: Amersfoort - Barneveld

References

External links
Dutch public transport travel planner 

Railway stations in Amersfoort
Railway stations opened in 2012